Hugh McPhillips (March 31, 1920 – October 31, 1990) was an American actor and director.

Early life
McPhillips was born in Suffern, New York to an Irish American Catholic family of three children.

Acting career
McPhillips was perhaps best known for winning a Daytime Emmy Award for Outstanding Cameo Appearance in a Drama Series for Days of Our Lives in 1980 as Hugh Pearson. He played Andre, the restaurant host, in The Young and the Restless and also appeared in many soap operas & films in 1980's.

Death
He died in October 1990 of injuries in an automobile accident in August of that year.

Filmography
The following credits, Awards & Nominations have been taken from 
Freddy's Nightmares ....Cabin Fever (1989) 1 TV episode .... Old Man
Murder, She Wrote ....Murder Through the Looking Glass (1988) 1 TV episode .... Father Paul Kelly
Kandyland (1987) .... Minister
The Young and the Restless .... Andre, Colonnade Room Patron / ... (4 episodes, 1986)...  Y&R (USA: promotional abbreviation)
Bachelor Party (1984) .... Father O'Donnell
Joysticks (1983) .... Pope ... a.k.a. Joy Sticks (International: English title: video box title) ... a.k.a. Video Madness
The Kid with the Broken Halo (1982) (TV) .... Pierce
The Jeffersons .... Not So Dearly Beloved (1981) 1 TV episode .... Old Man
Days of Our Lives (1965) TV series .... Hugh Pearson (unknown episodes, 1979)
All in the Family .... The Return of Stephanie's Father  (1 TV episode, 1979)....Derelict

Awards and nominations
1980  Won Daytime Emmy Outstanding Guest/Cameo Appearance in a Daytime Drama Series for Days of Our Lives in the 1980 as Hugh Pearson

1976  Nominated Daytime Emmy Outstanding Individual Director for a Daytime Drama Series
for: "The Doctors (soap opera)"

1974  Nominated Daytime Emmy Best Individual Director for a Drama Series
for: "The Doctors (soap opera)" (1963)

Related links
facebook

References

American male film actors
American male television actors
American people of Irish descent
Male actors from New York City
1920 births
1990 deaths
People from Suffern, New York
20th-century American male actors
Daytime Emmy Award winners
Daytime Emmy Award for Outstanding Guest Performer in a Drama Series winners